Charles Kellick (21 November 1842 – 27 March 1918) was an Australian cricketer. He played two first-class matches for New South Wales between 1865/66 and 1872/73.

See also
 List of New South Wales representative cricketers

References

External links
 

1842 births
1918 deaths
Australian cricketers
New South Wales cricketers
Cricketers from Sydney